Hyllisia consimilis is a species of beetle in the family Cerambycidae. It was described by Gahan in 1895.

References

consimilis
Beetles described in 1895
Taxa named by Charles Joseph Gahan